Euxoa basigramma is a moth of the family Noctuidae. It is found in Turkey, Iran and from Ukraine, Moldova, northern, north-western, central, eastern and south-western Russia to Mongolia.

External links
Fauna Europaea

Euxoa
Insects of Turkey
Moths described in 1870